Björn Christoffer Vilhelm Vikström (born 2 February 1987 in Borlänge, Sweden) is an Olympic swimmer from Sweden. He swam for Sweden at the 2008 Olympics.

Both his parents (Per Wikström and Eva Lundahl) and his brother Sebastian Wisktröm have represented Sweden. He holds the Swedish Junior Record in 100m Freestyle.

References

Swedish male freestyle swimmers
1987 births
Living people
Swimmers at the 2008 Summer Olympics
Olympic swimmers of Sweden
Upsala Simsällskap swimmers
People from Borlänge Municipality
Sportspeople from Dalarna County